Niakwa Country Club is a country club and golf course in Winnipeg, Manitoba, Canada. The 18-hole course was designed in 1923 by Stanley Thompson, the one of the most internationally recognised Canadian golf course architects.

Niakwa has hosted several major national tournaments, including the Canadian Open in 1961; the Canadian PGA Championship in 1946, 1952 and 1960; the RCGA Men's Amateur Championship in 1974 and 2011; and the Canadian Ladies' Amateur Championship in 1956, 1972, and 2001. The club has also hosted the Canadian Tour's Manitoba Open on several occasions and the Winnipeg Open, a PGA Tour event, in 1946 which was won by Ben Hogan.

See also
List of golf courses in Manitoba

References

External links

Sports venues in Winnipeg
Golf clubs and courses in Manitoba

St. Vital, Winnipeg